Hostage Rescue Force (Arabic: قوة إنقاذ الرهائن )(also known as Unit 333) is Egypt's premier domestic counter-terrorism and hostage rescue unit. It is subordinate to the National Security Directorate of the Egyptian Ministry of Interior.

References 

Law enforcement in Egypt
Hostage rescue units
Non-military counterterrorist organizations